Neuberger Museum of Art is located in Purchase, New York, United States. It is affiliated with Purchase College, part of the State University of New York system. It is the nation's tenth-largest university museum. The museum is one of 14 sites on the African American Heritage Trail of Westchester County.

Collections

The Neuberger Museum of Art is located in a Philip Johnson-designed building at the heart of Purchase College, State University of New York, in Purchase, NY.

Founded in 1969 with a promised gift of 300 works by Roy R. Neuberger—one of the greatest private collectors, philanthropists, and arts advocates of the twentieth century—the Museum's collection of modern, contemporary and African art has grown to over 6,000 objects by artists including Milton Avery, Romare Bearden, Willem de Kooning, Edward Hopper, Georgia O'Keeffe, and Jackson Pollock. Alongside the permanent collection, critically acclaimed special exhibitions feature the works of 20th-century masters, mid-career and emerging artists.

The museum's signature biannual award, the 'Roy R. Neuberger Prize', recognizes the work of exceptional contemporary artists, continuing its founding patron's dedication to supporting artists early in their careers.

Artists in the collection include Milton Avery, Romare Bearden, Stuart Davis, Willem de Kooning, Richard Diebenkorn, Arthur Dove, Helen Frankenthaler, Marsden Hartley, Hans Hofmann, Edward Hopper, Georgia O'Keeffe, Jackson Pollock, Mark Rothko, and David Smith.

Selected Woprks
Georgia O'Keeffe - "Lake George by Early Moonrise" - 1930
Marsden Hartley - "Fishermen's Last Supper, Nova Scotia" - 1940
John Marin - "Sea and Rocks, Mount Desert, Maine" - 1948
Lee Krasner - "Burning Candles" - 1955
Jackson Pollock - "Number 8" - 1949
Alexander Calder - "The Red Ear" - 1957
Mark Rothko - "Old Gold Over White" - 1956
Willem de Kooning - "Marilyn Monroe" - 1954
Mark Tobey - "Lyric" - 1957
Grace Hartigan - "Giftwares" - 1955
Richard Diebenkorn - "Girl on a Terrace" - 1956
Adolph Gotlieb - "Evil Omen" - 1946

Exhibition tours, lectures, films, and special events are offered throughout the year.

Directors
From 2005 to 2010, Thom Collins was the director. In July 2012, Paola Morsiani took over as the museum's director. Tracy Fitzpatrick became director in November 2014.

See also
List of university art museums and galleries in New York State

References

External links
 Neuberger.org: Neuberger Museum of Art website

Art museums and galleries in New York (state)
Museums in Westchester County, New York
Harrison, New York
State University of New York at Purchase
University art museums and galleries in New York (state)
1974 establishments in New York (state)
Art museums established in 1974
African art museums in the United States
African-American history of Westchester County, New York